The 1991 All-Pacific-10 Conference football team consists of American football players chosen by various organizations for All-Pacific-10 Conference teams for the 1991 college football season.

Offensive selections

Quarterbacks
Mike Pawlawski, California

Running backs
Tommy Vardell, Stanford
Russell White, California

Wide receivers
Mario Bailey, Washington
Sean LaChapelle, UCLA

Tight ends
Clarence Williams, Washington State

Tackles
Tony Boselli, USC
Lincoln Kennedy, Washington
Bob Whitfield, Stanford
Troy Auzenne, California

Guards
Vaughn Parker, UCLA

Centers
Ed Cunningham, Washington

Defensive selections

Ends
Steve Emtman, Washington
Shane Collins, Arizona State

Tackles
Marcus Woods, Oregon

Linebackers
Ron George, Stanford
Dave Hoffmann, Washington
Chico Fraley, Washington
Donald Jones, Washington

Cornerbacks
Dana Hall, Washington
Phillippi Sparks, Arizona State

Safeties
Matt Darby, UCLA
Eric Castle, Oregon

Special teams

Placekickers
Doug Brien, California

Punters
Jason Hanson, Washington State

All purpose/Return specialists 
Charles Levy, Arizona
Curtis Conway, USC

Key

See also
1991 College Football All-America Team

References

All-Pacific-10 Conference Football Team
All-Pac-12 Conference football teams